Joachim Brunn de Neergaard (27 April 1877 – 31 October 1920) was a Danish composer.

Neergaard was born in Stubberup, a small village in the east-central part of Jutland in 1877. He came from scions of an aristocratic family with long service to the Danish government and as such was eventually sent to take a law degree which he finished in 1901. However, Neergaard's true love was music and not the law. He had studied piano from the time of his youth and wished to pursue a career in music. To this end, he took advanced piano studies while at the same time studying theory and composition. Neergaard, whose life was relatively short, was not a prolific composer and left us with less than 30 works. He died in Sorø, south of Copenhagen, in 1920.

He wrote a little-known but highly regarded string quartet between 1908 and 1910. It is written in a post-Brahmsian, late Romantic idiom, a style cultivated at that time by composers such as Arnold Schoenberg (before he started composing 12 tone music), Ernő Dohnányi, Ferruccio Busoni, Zemlinsky, Karl Weigl, and Franz Schmidt. Of this quartet, the editor of The Chamber Music Journal has written, "Neergaard's Quartet is as fine as anything from this period. The melodies are lush and memorable, the movements perfectly executed and the part-writing leaves nothing to be desired."

References

Some of the information on this page appears on the website of Edition Silvertrust but permission has been granted to copy, distribute and/or modify this document under the terms of the GNU Free Documentation License.

External links
Joachim Neergaard String Quartet No.1, Op.6 Description.
The Chamber Music Journal

Danish composers
Male composers
1877 births
1920 deaths
Neergaard (noble family)
People from Faxe Municipality